Alain Michel Ekwe (born 20 March 1982 in Douala) is a Cameroonian footballer who plays as a forward. He also has Portuguese nationality, due to the many years spent in the country.

Ekwe played professional football in Portugal, Malta, Greece, Vietnam and Costa Rica, his biggest achievement being appearing in the second division for both Leça FC, Asteras Tripolis F.C. and Kastoria FC (one season apiece).

References

External links

1982 births
Living people
Footballers from Douala
Cameroonian footballers
Association football forwards
Gondomar S.C. players
Leça F.C. players
Pietà Hotspurs F.C. players
Asteras Tripolis F.C. players
Aiolikos F.C. players
Kastoria F.C. players
Puntarenas F.C. players
Cameroonian expatriate footballers
Expatriate footballers in Portugal
Expatriate footballers in Malta
Expatriate footballers in Greece
Expatriate footballers in Vietnam
Expatriate footballers in Costa Rica